"Kind of a Drag" is a song written by Jim Holvay and recorded by the Buckinghams.  It was the title track of their debut LP.  The single reached #1 on the U.S. Hot 100 in February 1967, becoming the first #1 single within the new calendar year, remaining in the top position for two weeks, earning a gold disc.

It was the first of the band's three Top 10 hits in 1967, among five total Top 40 hits for that year.  Holvay was Chicago-based and had been performing with a group called The Mob.

The co-producers of "Kind of a Drag" were the band's first personal manager Carl Bonafede and big band leader Dan Belloc, owner of the Holiday Ballroom in Chicago. The arranger of the horn sound was Frank Tesinsky. The engineer at the first recording sessions held at Chess Records in Chicago was Ron Malo, who also mixed the final recording. The producers  wanted to speed up the tempo of the final release. Ron Malo had the ability to do that, according to lead guitar player Carl Giammarese; Malo was able to keep "Kind of a Drag" in the key of G. Following this, the band's debut album, also entitled Kind of a Drag, was released and featured the band's early recordings.

Chart performance

Weekly charts

Year-end charts

References

External links
 

1966 singles
1967 singles
The Buckinghams songs
Songs written by Jim Holvay
Billboard Hot 100 number-one singles
RPM Top Singles number-one singles
1966 songs